is a former Japanese football player.

Playing career
Mukojima was born in Shizuoka Prefecture on January 9, 1966. After graduating from Kokushikan University, he joined Toshiba in 1988. He played as regular player first season. In 1992, he moved to new club Shimizu S-Pulse based in his local. He played many matches from first season and the club won the 2nd place 1992 and 1993 J.League Cup. However his opportunity to play decreased in 1996 and he moved to Japan Football League club Kawasaki Frontale in 1997. The club was promoted to J2 League in 1999 and J1 League in 2000. He retired end of 2001 season.

Club statistics

References

External links

1966 births
Living people
Kokushikan University alumni
Association football people from Shizuoka Prefecture
Japanese footballers
Japan Soccer League players
J1 League players
J2 League players
Japan Football League (1992–1998) players
Hokkaido Consadole Sapporo players
Shimizu S-Pulse players
Kawasaki Frontale players
Association football forwards